‌The 2021 IHF Men's Super Globe was the 14th edition of the yearly club world championship and held from 5 to 9 October 2021 at Jeddah, Saudi Arabia under the aegis of International Handball Federation (IHF). It was the second time in history that the event was organised by the Saudi Arabian Handball Federation.

SC Magdeburg won their first title by defeating FC Barcelona in the final.

Venue
The championship will be played in Jeddah, at the King Abdullah Sports City.

Teams
Ten teams competed in the tournament. The winners of the continental tournaments, the defending champion, a host team and a wild card team.

Referees
The referee pairs were announced on 31 August 2021.

Results
All times are local (UTC+3).

Bracket

Quarterfinals qualification

Quarterfinals

Placement round 5–10

Group A

Group B

Semifinals

Third place game

Final

Final ranking

References

External links
Official website
IHF website

2021 in handball
2021
2021 in Saudi Arabian sport
International handball competitions hosted by Saudi Arabia
Handball in Saudi Arabia
October 2021 sports events in Asia